The Society of Infectious Diseases Pharmacists (SIDP) is a non-profit professional association of pharmacists and allied health professionals who specialize in infectious diseases and antimicrobial stewardship. According to the Board of Pharmaceutical Specialties, clinical pharmacists specializing in infectious diseases are trained in the use of microbiology and pharmacology to develop, implement, and monitor drug regimens that incorporate the pharmacodynamics and pharmacokinetics of antimicrobials for patients.

Headquartered in Geneva, Illinois, the organization was founded in 1990 and its 1700+ members are involved in patient care, research, teaching, pharmaceutical industry, and government. Its stated mission is to "Advance infectious diseases pharmacy and lead antimicrobial stewardship in order to optimize the care of patients." In order to achieve its mission, SIDP collaborates with several other healthcare organizations including the Infectious Diseases Society of America (IDSA), American College of Clinical Pharmacy (ACCP), Society for Healthcare Epidemiology of America (SHEA) and American Society for Microbiology (ASM). American Society of Health-System Pharmacists (ASHP), Clinical and Laboratory Standards Institute (CLSI), European Society of Clinical Microbiology and Infectious Diseases (ESCMID), European Society of Clinical Pharmacy (ESCP), Making a Difference in Infectious Diseases (MAD-ID), and Pharmaceutical Forum of the Americas (FIP).

Advocacy for antimicrobial resistance 
The World Health Organization and Centers for Disease Control and Prevention have identified antimicrobial resistance as one of the biggest public health threats of our time. SIDP has identified promoting the appropriate use of antimicrobials and decreasing resistance as priorities for the organization. In 2003, SIDP warned of an "exponential increase in resistance" by antibiotic-resistant bacteria. In 2009, SIDP supported a study that identified antibiotics which appeared less likely to lead to antibiotic resistance. The SIDP Policy and Government Affairs Committee (PGA) focuses efforts on legislative and regulatory matters related to infectious diseases therapeutics and antimicrobial use and resistance. The SIDP Public Outreach Committee develops partnerships, activities, and programs that educate the general public on the safe and effective use of antimicrobials and pharmacists’ roles in antimicrobial stewardship. The SIDP Diversity, Equity, and Inclusion (DEI) Committee is committed to creating and sustaining an inclusive and welcoming society and improving the representation of minorities in our membership, leadership, and profession. SIDP advocates to government and private entities on key issues and educates the public, together with strategic partners, to enact positive change.

Together, these SIDP Committees carry out the SIDP Advocacy agenda focusing on the following priorities:

1. Optimizing patient outcomes through the appropriate use of antimicrobials, novel anti-infectives and vaccines

2. Antimicrobial resistance (AMR) and patient safety

3. Education of patients and healthcare professionals regarding the safe and effective use of antimicrobials

4. The role of pharmacists as essential healthcare and public health providers in the fight against infectious diseases and AMR

Further information regarding SIDP Advocacy can be found at: https://sidp.org/Policy.

Presidential Advisory Council on Combating Antibiotic-Resistant Bacteria (PACCARB) 
In January 2019, the Presidential Advisory Council on Combating Antibiotic-Resistant Bacteria (PACCARB) convened to respond to the charge of the United States Secretary of Health and Human Services, Alex Azar, to gather public input on combating antimicrobial resistance. Former SIDP president, Kerry LaPlante presented public comments stating the need to prioritize accelerating research and development of new antimicrobials through innovative funding mechanisms, protecting the supply of existing drugs, and developing strategies to mitigate anti-infective shortages. LaPlante said, "Together, we scramble to concoct mixtures of antibiotics, using in vitro data, hoping to override resistance and hoping for synergy to save our dying patients. Many of these patients have already endured and overcome months of chemotherapy, only to find themselves kicked down and fighting for their lives – again." In September 2020, Elizabeth Dodds-Ashley, former SIDP President, was appointed as a designated representative to PACCARB.

U.S. Government Antimicrobial Resistance (AMR) Challenge 
The U.S. Government Antimicrobial Resistance (AMR) Challenge is a global initiative, launched in 2018, that charges pharmaceutical and health insurance companies, food animal producers and purchasers, medical professionals, government health officials, and other industry leaders from around the world to work together to address antibiotic resistance. The AMR Challenge is a way for organizations to make formal commitments to further the progress against antimicrobial resistance.

SIDP has submitted a commitment to the AMR Challenge to promote appropriate antimicrobial use. As part of this commitment, in 2019, SIDP collaborated with the Centers for Disease Control and Prevention and the American Society of Health-System Pharmacists to develop educational materials on how pharmacists can improve antimicrobial use. Healthcare providers can submit a formal commitment to adopt these practices.

According to Secretary Azar, nearly 350 national and international organizations have committed to the AMR Challenge, including Infectious Diseases Society of America, American Academy of Emergency Medicine, American Cancer Society, Pew Charitable Trusts, and the U.S. Department of Defense

Legislative support 
On June 4, 2019, the Developing an Innovative Strategy for Antimicrobial Resistant Microorganisms (DISARM) Act S. 1712 was introduced by United States Senators Johnny Isakson (R-GA) and Bob Casey (D-PA). The DISARM Act would promote antibiotic research and development and preserve existing antibiotics by improving Medicare reimbursement for antibiotics and promoting their appropriate use.  SIDP joined other medical organizations such as Infectious Diseases Society of America, American Academy of Allergy, Asthma and Immunology and American Society for Microbiology in signing a letter of support for the DISARM Act.

Similarly, SIDP and other infectious diseases organizations have signed a letter of support for the Strategies to Address Antimicrobial Resistance Act (STAAR) which is aimed at strengthening existing federal infrastructure for surveillance, data collection, and research efforts.

Publications and activities 
Other activities SIDP engages in include clinical guidance, position statements, and education. SIDP has endorsed guidance for necessary skills for antimicrobial stewardship leaders, the essential role of pharmacists in antimicrobial stewardship, management of COVID-19, and the optimal use of polymyxins.  In addition, SIDP has published position statements promoting the appropriate use of antimicrobials in various settings such as agricultural applications and ambulatory care settings. For all publications, visit: https://sidp.org/SIDP-Publications

At the close of 2019 it was announced that SIDP would become a partner in IDWeekTM. IDWeekTM is the joint annual meeting of the Infectious Diseases Society of America (IDSA), Society for Healthcare Epidemiology of America (SHEA), the HIV Medicine Association (HIVMA), the Pediatric Infectious Diseases Society (PIDS), and the Society of Infectious Diseases Pharmacists (SIDP). As a partner society, SIDP has a representative on the official planning committee who serves a 3-year term. The goal of SIDP in our role as a partner organization of IDWeekTM is to bring experts together in research and practice to present and network at the annual meeting. The annual SIDP business meeting and reception are currently held in conjunction with IDWeekTM.

Educational Programming 
The SIDP Continuing Education Center (SIDP - SIDP Education Center) provides continuing education related to prevention and optimized treatment of infectious diseases through both live learning and self-guided learning sessions. This includes on-demand modules, live webinars and symposia, podcasts, journal articles and subscriptions and comprehensive certificate programs. Though primarily targeted towards pharmacists, many of the educational modules are also accredited for continuing education of other healthcare disciplines. SIDP additionally funds education grants for initiatives that provide public education or support novel training mechanisms for healthcare professionals. On an annual basis, over 50 continuing education activities and an average 6,500 continuing education credits are delivered by SIDP. SIDP is a BPS-approved professional development program for program for BCIDP recertification since 2019.

Public Outreach 
SIDP is committed to educating the public about the role of ID pharmacists and the optimal use of antimicrobials. An antimicrobial stewardship advocacy toolkit was created to inform healthcare providers on the proper use of antimicrobials and ways to educate patients. During the COVID-19 pandemic, handouts were developed to educate the public on the safety and efficacy of COVID-19 vaccines. Beginning in 2022, the organization promotes an ID pharmacist advocacy day through social media on the first Thursday of every month. 

One major Public Outreach event is Infectious Diseases Pharmacists Day which is an annual event held on May 22nd to celebrate the essential work infectious diseases pharmacists perform each day to combat antimicrobial resistance and optimize the care of patients. The inaugural Infectious Diseases Pharmacists Day took place on May 22nd, 2021. Given the important role infectious diseases pharmacists played during the first year of the COVID-19 pandemic, the theme was “Essential COVID-19 Healthcare Workers”. The theme for the second annual Infectious Diseases Pharmacists Day was “Deprescribing Antibiotics in COVID-19” and took place on May 22nd, 2022.

Breakpoints- The SIDP Podcast 
Launched July 2019, Breakpoints is the official podcast of SIDP. Episodes are released monthly and feature thought leaders in infectious diseases discussing contemporary topics and clinical controversies. Listeners can tune in from Apple Podcasts, Stitcher, Spotify, Overcast, and other popular podcast hosting websites.

Find us on Social Media 
Twitter: https://twitter.com/SIDPharm

Facebook: https://www.facebook.com/sidprx

Instagram: https://www.instagram.com/sidpharm/?hl=en

LinkedIn: https://www.linkedin.com/company/sidp/?viewAsMember=true

Youtube: https://www.youtube.com/channel/UCilc27qyGRjspTpzcegJ8eQ/videos

References

External links 
 https://www.sidp.org/

Pharmacy organizations
Infectious disease organizations
1990 establishments in Illinois
Scientific organizations based in the United States
Scientific organizations established in 1990
Geneva, Illinois